Rowell Lyngdoh (1935/1936 – March 2022) was an Indian politician from the state of Meghalaya who represented the Mawkyrwat (ST) constituency in the South West Khasi Hills district in the Meghalaya Legislative Assembly during 2008–2013.

On 4 January 2018, Lyngdoh left the Indian National Congress and joined the National People's Party.

He died in March 2022 aged 86.

References

1930s births
2022 deaths
Year of birth uncertain

Meghalaya politicians

Indian National Congress politicians
National People's Party (India) politicians
People from South West Khasi Hills district
Deputy chief ministers of Meghalaya